Through the Wilderness is a tribute album with contributions from a variety of artists dedicated to American singer Madonna. It was released on November 27, 2007, by Los Angeles-based Manimal Vinyl Records. According to label head Paul Beahan, the idea for the album was conceived by him in a dream. He enlisted multiple artists to work on the project, including Giant Drag, Lavender Diamond, Winter Flowers and Chapin Sisters. Although he's not a fan of Madonna, Beahan wanted to see how her songs would sound when covered by different musicians.

Through the Wilderness is a psychedelic-folk tribute to Madonna without adhering to any particular coherent sound. The cover songs were composed differently from the original versions by the performers; they changed the melody of the Madonna tracks by tweaking the lyrics and re-interpreting the actual meaning. Music critics both complimented and criticized the songs, noting the strength of Madonna's discography in the album's tracklist.

Background and release

In February 2007, Los Angeles-based Manimal Vinyl record company announced its plan of releasing a compilation album containing cover versions of songs by American singer Madonna. Initial artists listed in the roster included Devendra Banhart, Giant Drag, Lavender Diamond, and VietNam, among others. Manimal Vinyl label head Paul Beahan confirmed that 25% of the profit earned from the album sales would be donated to Madonna's Raising Malawi foundation. Named Through the Wilderness, the record was the third project to be released by the company. It was originally reported to be released on September 4, 2007, but was delayed until November 27, 2007. Special release parties were organized in Los Angeles and New York, featuring the artists who recorded songs for the project.

Beahan had been thinking of releasing a tribute record through his company for a long time, following the death of musicians Arthur Lee and Syd Barrett in 2006. However, he changed his mind and instead chose Madonna, believing her songs could be recorded as serious-sounding tracks, thereby eliminating chances of it being a novelty release. The idea for Through the Wilderness originated from an epiphany Beahan had about Madonna. Although not a fan of the singer, he was intrigued about how her songs would sound when treated by alternative musicians. "The Madonna tribute came to me in a dream last fall, and I immediately started making calls and emails to Winter Flowers, Chapin Sisters, and Banhart asking them to record a song for it," Beahan clarified to Spin magazine.

Banhart and VietNam were not included in the final track list of the album. Other artists mentioned by Beahan for the record, but not included, were Cat Power and Thurston Moore. Through the Wilderness is a psychedelic-folk tribute to Madonna, with the songs spanning her entire career until that point, from "Lucky Star" (1984) to "Hung Up" (2005). The title is a reference to the opening line of Madonna's "Like a Virgin" where she sings, "I made it through the wilderness..." Beahan had asked all the bands to pick their own songs. He suggested to the Chapin Sisters to record "Borderline" instead of "Like a Virgin". Becky Stark of Lavender Diamond wanted to sing "Like a Prayer" for the album. Similarly, Lion of Panjshir sent a demo of "Crazy for You" which the label head accepted. Indie rock band Giant Drag confirmed on their official website that they were recording Madonna's "Oh Father" for the release. Rock musician The Prayers covered "Cherish" for the project.

Composition

The groups covering the songs changed the melody of the original Madonna tracks, by tweaking the lyrics and re-interpreting the actual meaning. According to Stephen M. Deusner from Pitchfork Media, the album did not have a particular or coherent sound and it "doesn't get bogged down in musical proselytizing or cultural weight-shifting". The synthpop-influenced covers of "Into the Groove" and "Everybody" by Jeremy Jay and Ariel Pink, respectively, were given as examples by Deusner, emphasizing the post-punk era of the songs, but still being different enough from Madonna's versions. The former added layers of synths and spoken echoing verses while the latter featured vocals from Julia Holter backed by keyboards and drums.

Through the Wilderness opens with Jonathan Wilson's piano version of "La Isla Bonita" whose chorus consists of a 1970s electric guitar against a reverb. "Borderline" featured vocal harmonies by the Chapin Sisters with percussion and banjos as instrumentation. Lavender Diamond's cover of "Like a Prayer" is a low-key version, but vocals and instrumentation are given equal importance. Giant Drag's "Oh Father" sticks to the original Madonna composition, but adds piano, bass and chimes.

A guitar-influenced version was created by Golden Animals, who turned "Beautiful Stranger" into a swamp blues track by removing the chorus and making it reminiscent of songs by Creedence Clearwater Revival. A freak folk recording of "Lucky Star" was composed by Alexandra Hope, while Lion of Panjshir included a multi-array of instruments in "Crazy for You" like sitar, tabla and acoustic guitar, with lead singer Ariana Delawari belting in breathy vocals. The Crosby, Stills, Nash & Young-influenced version of "Live to Tell" was created by the Winter Flowers, with "desert sunset atmosphere, noodly guitar fills, epic solos, and gorgeous harmonies sung by [lead singers] Astrid Quay and Gavin Toler".

Critical reception

Deusner gave the album a rating of 7 out of 10, complimenting the release by adding that, "Madonna is an ideal candidate for the tribute album treatment, having already inspired several in the past but none [are] quite as sturdy or as much fun as Through the Wilderness". However he felt that few of the songs were "uninspired", like Drag's version of "Oh Father" and Bubonic Plague's rendition of Who's That Girl. Jon Caramanica from Spin also gave a positive review, saying that the album captures "Madonna's vivacious side, but [reminds that she was] desperate too". He particularly commended "Crazy for You", saying that "the last 30 seconds of [the track is] chilling—frontwoman Ariana Delawari and her traditional Afghan backing accelerate feverishly, breaking the sweat Madonna never quite did, or could".

Bruce Scott from Prefix rated the album 6 on 10, and opined that "in patches" the record holds up well as a tribute release. He listed the tracks "Into the Groove", "Everybody" and "La Isla Bonita" as highlights, but criticized the cover of the ballads which he felt diminished the quality. "Through the Wilderness reminds that these [tracks] can withstand some reinventing no matter how minimal or lo-fi the arrangement, because the songs themselves are strong," Scott concluded.

Chris Morgan from Treble noticed the lack of coherence in the album, but complimented the attention bestowed on giving prominence to the "hook and peppiness" of the songs. However, he still found that "be it because their sound is not right for covering such an act or because they let their imagination run a little too wild for the sake of the art of reinterpretation, the creativity is vulnerable to quickly becoming a gimmick." He listed "Oh Father" and "Like a Prayer" as two highlights, describing them as the "most resonant".

Track listing

Personnel
Credits and personnel adapted from AllMusic.

Apollo Heights – producer, performer
Linda Beecroft – drums, vocals
P. Brown – composer
Bubonic Plague – producer, performer
Justin Burrill – audio engineer, engineer
The Chapin Sisters – producer, performer
Abigail Chapin – choir/chorus, guitar, keyboards, vocals
Lily Chapin – banjo, keyboards, vocals
Daniel Chavis – vocals
Danny Chavis – guitar
Jessica Craven – vocals
Ariana Delawari – guitar, vocals
Erica García – producer, instrumentation
Micah Gaugh – bass, keyboards
Giant Drag – performer
Golden Animals – performer
Steve Gregoropoulos – guitar, piano
Max Guirand – engineer, slide guitar
Annie Hardy – vocals
Tim Hogan – bass
Julia Holter – vocals (background)
Alexandra Hope – performer
Dan Horne – audio engineer, engineer, mixing, tambourine
Jeremy Jay – arranger, producer, performer
Tom Carney Myung Hi Kim – engineer
Ben Knight – guitar (classical), guitar (electric)
Lavender Diamond – performer
Lion of Panjshir – performer
Max Guirand – audio engineer, producer
Andrew Miller – guitar, vocals
Ethan Miller – producer
Thom Monahan – producer, beat box, drum machine, engineer
Mountain Party – performer
Michael Mussmano – producer
Ofer Tiberin – producer
Ariel Pink's Haunted Graffiti – arranger, producer, performer
Heather Porcaro – choir/chorus
Prayers – producer
The Prayers – performer
Astrid Quay – Artwork, vocals
Darren Rademaker – guitar (acoustic), vocals
Ron Regé Jr. – drums
Charles Rowell – bass
Josh Schwartz – guitar (acoustic), guitar (Electric)
Aaron Sperske – drums
Becky Stark – audio engineer, vocals
Chad Stewart – drums
Tom Kim – audio engineer, producer
The Tyde – performer
Julian Wass – audio engineer, producer, engineer
Jonathan Wilson – producer, performer
Jonathan Wilson – arranger
Winter Flowers – producer, performer
Kenny Woods – audio engineer
Gideon Zaretsky – producer

References

External links
 Manimal Vinyl Records > Full Catalog

2007 compilation albums
Charity albums
Folk albums by American artists
Folk compilation albums
Tribute albums
Psychedelic music albums by American artists
Psychedelic music compilation albums
Madonna tribute albums